Oswaldo Maestro dos Santos Guimarães (born 23 October 1989) is a Brazilian handball player for Balonmano Torrelavega and the Brazilian handball team.

He won a gold medal the 2015 Pan American Games and competed for Brazil at the 2013 World Championships and 2016 Summer Olympics.

References

1989 births
Living people
Handball players from São Paulo
Brazilian male handball players
Liga ASOBAL players
Brazilian expatriate sportspeople in Spain
Olympic handball players of Brazil
Handball players at the 2016 Summer Olympics
Handball players at the 2015 Pan American Games
Handball players at the 2019 Pan American Games
Pan American Games medalists in handball
Pan American Games gold medalists for Brazil
Pan American Games bronze medalists for Brazil
Expatriate handball players
South American Games gold medalists for Brazil
South American Games medalists in handball
BM Granollers players
Competitors at the 2018 South American Games
Medalists at the 2015 Pan American Games
Medalists at the 2019 Pan American Games
21st-century Brazilian people